Sokol Gjoka is an Albanian diplomat and he served as Albanian ambassador to the Russian Federation till 2014. He presented his credentials to Russian President Dmitry Medvedev on 12 October 2009. Now he works at Albanian Ministry for Europe and Foreign Affairs.

References

Ambassadors of Albania to Russia
Living people
Year of birth missing (living people)